"Bury Me" is the first single by heavy metal band Black Tide from their second studio album, Post Mortem. It was released on September 17, 2010, and includes a B-side called "Honest Eyes", which was also released as a stand-alone digital single. Both of the songs were written some band members and Josh Wilbur, and produced by Josh Wilbur and GGGarth.

Music video
On December 20, 2010, the band released the music video for the song. The music video live footage shot by the band during their fall 2010 tour. On the same day, the band also released a similar live video for their old single "Warriors of Time" from their previous album Light from Above.

Live performance
The song was performed live for the first time on September 24, 2010, at the Fillmore in Charlotte, North Carolina, while supporting Bullet for my Valentine. On that night, the band also played another new song called "Let It Out".

Sound
The sound is much different from the band's previous album Light from Above. This can be heard mostly due to Gabriel Garcia's change in vocal style, which is now much darker. The speed metal influence is no longer present, with the sound is being more melodic, heavier and a bit slower than the previous album. It also features small metalcore elements such as a breakdown and screamed vocals.

Trivia
It is the first Black Tide single to include rhythm guitarist Austin Diaz.
The song's working title was "Austin's Nightmare".

Track listing

CD Single

Digital Single

Charts

Personnel
 Gabriel Garcia: vocals, lead guitar
 Austin Diaz: rhythm guitar, backing vocals
 Zakk Sandler: bass guitar, vocals
 Steven Spence: drums, percussion

References

https://www.youtube.com/watch?v=sg3UW0Jrkkg&feature=channel
https://www.youtube.com/watch?v=ybiaO5NO9Kw

2010 singles
Black Tide songs
2010 songs
Interscope Records singles